The 2009 CONCACAF Gold Cup Final was a soccer match that took place on July 26, 2009, at Giants Stadium in East Rutherford, New Jersey, United States, to determine the winner of the 2009 CONCACAF Gold Cup.

Mexico won their 5th. Gold Cup (and 8th. continental title to date including the CONCACAF Championship) after thrashing United States 5–0.

Background
This was the eighth CONCACAF Gold Cup final that featured the United States. They had won the title four times, most recently in 2007. Their opponent, Mexico, had won the tournament seven times, most recently in 2003. The two teams are longtime rivals and met twice before, splitting wins. The 2009 final was the last U.S. match to be played at Giants Stadium before its demolition.

Route to the final

Match

Details

References

External links
 Official website

Final
United States men's national soccer team matches
Mexico national football team matches
CONCACAF Gold Cup Final
CONCACAF Gold Cup Final
CONCACAF Gold Cup finals
Mexico–United States soccer rivalry
Sports competitions in East Rutherford, New Jersey
CONCACAF Gold Cup Final
CONCACAF Gold Cup Final
21st century in East Rutherford, New Jersey
Soccer in New Jersey